Udea azorensis is a species of moth in the family Crambidae. It is found on the Azores.

References

azorensis
Moths of Africa
Fauna of the Azores
Moths described in 1997